Soyuz (meaning "union", GRAU index 11A511) is a family of expendable Russian and Soviet carrier rockets developed by OKB-1 and manufactured by Progress Rocket Space Centre in Samara, Russia. With over 1,900 flights since its debut in 1966, the Soyuz is the most frequently used launch vehicle in the world as of 2021.

For nearly a decade, between the final flight of the Space Shuttle program in 2011 and the 2020 first crewed mission of SpaceX's Falcon 9 rocket, Soyuz rockets were the only launch vehicles able and approved for transporting astronauts to the International Space Station.

The Soyuz vehicles are used as the launcher for the crewed Soyuz spacecraft as part of the Soyuz programme, as well as to launch uncrewed Progress supply spacecraft to the International Space Station and for commercial launches marketed and operated by Starsem and Arianespace. All Soyuz rockets use RP-1 and liquid oxygen (LOX) propellant, with the exception of the Soyuz-U2, which used Syntin, a variant of RP-1, with LOX. The Soyuz family is a subset of the R-7 family.

History

A space workhorse 

The Soyuz launcher was introduced in 1966, deriving from the Vostok launcher, which in turn was based on the 8K74 or R-7a intercontinental ballistic missile. It was initially a three-stage rocket with a Block I upper stage. The first four test launches were all failures, but eventually it worked. Later a Molniya variant was produced by adding a fourth stage, allowing it to reach the highly elliptical Molniya orbit. A later variant was the Soyuz-U. While the exact model and variant designations were kept secret from the west, the Soyuz launcher was referred to by either the United States Department of Defense designation of SL-4, or the Sheldon designation of A-2 (developed by Charles S. Sheldon, an analyst with the Library of Congress). Both systems for naming Soviet rockets stopped being used as more accurate information became available.

The production of Soyuz launchers reached a peak of 60 per year in the early 1980s. It has become the world's most used space launcher, flying over 1700 times, far more than any other rocket. Despite its age and perhaps thanks to its simplicity, this rocket family has been notable for its low cost and high reliability.

Soyuz / Fregat 

In the early 1990s plans were made for a redesigned Soyuz with a Fregat upper stage. The Fregat engine was developed by NPO Lavochkin from the propulsion module of its Phobos interplanetary probes. Although endorsed by the Roscosmos and the Russian Ministry of Defence in 1993 and designated "Rus" as a Russification and modernisation of Soyuz, and later renamed Soyuz-2, a funding shortage prevented implementation of the plan. The creation of Starsem in July 1996 provided new funding for the creation of a less ambitious variant, the Soyuz-Fregat or Soyuz-U/Fregat. This consisted of a slightly modified Soyuz-U combined with the Fregat upper stage, with a capacity of up to 1350 kg to geostationary transfer orbit. In April 1997, Starsem obtained a contract from the European Space Agency (ESA) to launch two pairs of Cluster II plasma science satellites using the Soyuz-Fregat. Before the introduction of this new model, Starsem launched 24 satellites of the Globalstar constellation in 6 launches with a restartable Ikar upper stage, between 22 September 1999 and 22 November 1999. After successful test flights of Soyuz-Fregat on 9 February 2000 and 20 March 2000, the Cluster II satellites were launched on 16 July 2000 and 9 August 2000. Another Soyuz-Fregat launched the ESA's Mars Express probe from Baikonur in June 2003. Now the Soyuz-Fregat launcher is used by Starsem for commercial payloads.

ISS crew transport 
Between 1 February 2003 and 26 July 2005 with the grounding of the United States Space Shuttle fleet, Soyuz was the only means of transportation to and from the International Space Station. This included the transfer of supplies, via Progress spacecraft, and crew changeovers. After the retirement of the Space Shuttle fleet in 2011, the United States space program was without any means to take astronauts into orbit, and NASA was dependent on the Soyuz to send crew into space until 2020. NASA resumed crewed flights from the United States in 2020 through the Commercial Crew Development program.

Recent incidents 
A long string of successful Soyuz launches was broken on 15 October 2002 when the uncrewed Soyuz-U launch of the Photon-M satellite from Plesetsk fell back near the launch pad and exploded 29 seconds after lift-off. One person from the ground crew was killed and eight were injured.

Another failure occurred on 21 June 2005, during a Molniya military communications satellite launch from the Plesetsk launch site, which used a four-stage version of the rocket called Molniya-M. The flight ended six minutes after the launch because of a failure of the third stage engine or an unfulfilled order to separate the second and third stages. The rocket's second and third stages, which are identical to the Soyuz, and its payload (a Molniya-3K satellite) crashed in the Uvatsky region of Tyumen (Siberia).

On 24 August 2011, an uncrewed Soyuz-U carrying cargo to the International Space Station crashed, failing to reach orbit. On December 23, 2011, a Soyuz-2.1b launching a Meridian 5 military communications satellite failed in the 7th minute of launch because of an anomaly in the third stage.

On 11 October 2018, the Soyuz MS-10 mission to the International Space Station failed to reach orbit after an issue with the main booster. The launch escape system was used to pull the Soyuz spacecraft away from the malfunctioning rocket. The two crew, Aleksey Ovchinin and Nick Hague, followed a ballistic trajectory and landed safely over 400 km downrange from the Baikonur Cosmodrome.

Soyuz-2 and Guiana spaceport 

The venerable Soyuz launcher was gradually replaced by a new version, named Soyuz-2 or Soyuz/ST, which has a new digital guidance system and a highly modified third stage with a new engine. The first development version of Soyuz-2 called Soyuz-2-1a, which is equipped with the digital guidance system, but is still propelled by an old third stage engine, started on 4 November 2004 from Plesetsk on a suborbital test flight, followed by an orbital flight on 23 October 2006 from Baikonur. The fully modified launcher (version Soyuz-2-1b) flew first on 27 December 2006 with the CoRoT satellite from the Baikonur Cosmodrome.

On 19 January 2005, the European Space Agency (ESA) and the Roscosmos agreed to launch Soyuz/ST rockets from the Guiana Space Centre. The equatorial launch site allows the Soyuz to deliver 2.7 to 4.9 tonnes into sun-synchronous orbit, depending on the third-stage engine used. Construction of a new pad started in 2005 and was completed in April 2011. The pad used vertical loading common at French Guiana, unlike the horizontal loading used at the Baikonur Cosmodrome. A simulated launch was conducted in early May 2011. The first operational launch happened on 21 October 2011, bearing the first two satellites in Galileo global positioning system.

The Soyuz-U and Soyuz-FG rockets are gradually being replaced by Soyuz-2 from 2014 onwards. Soyuz-U was retired in 2017, while Soyuz-FG carried astronaut crews to the ISS until September 2019 (final flight Soyuz MS-15 25 September 2019).

Variants 

 Soyuz 11A511 (1966-1975)
 Soyuz-L 11A511L (1970-1971)
 Soyuz-M 11A511M (1971-1976)
 Soyuz-U 11A511U (1973-2017)
 Soyuz-U2 11A511U2 or 11A511K (1982-1995)
 Soyuz-FG 11A511U-FG (2001-2019)
 Soyuz-2 14A14 (2006-present)

The Molniya-M (1964-2010) was also derived from the Soyuz family.

Assembly 

The rocket is assembled horizontally in the Assembly and Testing Building. The assembled rocket is transported to the launch site in its horizontal state and then raised. This is different from the vertical assembly of, for example, the Saturn V, and is one of the features that makes Soyuz cheaper to prepare for launch. Assembling a horizontally positioned rocket is relatively simple as all modules are easily accessible. Assembling the rocket in vertical position would require a windproof high-rise hangar, which was not considered financially feasible at the time the rocket was designed, due to the failing economy of the Soviet Union.

Prelaunch 

The entire rocket is suspended in the launch system by the load-bearing mechanisms on the strap-on boosters where they are attached to the central core. The latter rests on the nose sections of the strap-on boosters. This scheme resembles flight conditions when the strap-on boosters push the central core forward. The concept of suspending the rocket was one of the novelties introduced with the R-7/Soyuz.

Since the launch pad has been eliminated, the bottom portion of the rocket is lowered. The launch system trusses bear the wind loads. Resistance to high wind is an important feature of the launch system, as the Kazakhstan steppes, where the Baikonur launch site is located, are known for windstorms.

Launch 

The engines are ignited by electrically initiated pyrotechnic flares, mounted on birch poles, which are ignited at approximately T-20 seconds, a few seconds before fuel components are introduced into the combustion chamber. This sequence rarely fails due to its simplicity. During launch, the support booms track the movement of the rocket. After the support boom heads emerge from the special support recess in the nose sections of the strapons, the support booms and trusses disconnect from the rocket airframe, swiveling on the support axes and freeing the way for the rocket to lift off. During launch, the rocket and the launch facility form a single dynamic system.

When the strapon booster engines stop, the boosters fall away, providing nonimpact separation. If the skies are clear, ground observers can see a Korolev cross formed by the falling boosters.

Fairings used for uncrewed missions 
The Soyuz launch vehicle is used for various Russian uncrewed missions and is also marketed by Starsem for commercial satellite launches. Presently the following fairing types are used:

Progress is the cargo spacecraft for uncrewed missions to the ISS and previously to Mir. The spacecraft uses a dedicated platform and fairing and can be launched with either Soyuz-U, Soyuz-FG or Soyuz-2.

A-type fairing is used for commercial launches.

S-type fairing is used for commercial launches by Starsem. The fairing has external diameter of 3.7 m and a length of 7.7 m. The Fregat upper stage is encapsulated in the fairing with the payload and a payload adapter/dispenser. S-type fairing along with Fregat upper stage were used to launch the following spacecraft: Galaxy 14, GIOVE A, Mars Express, AMOS-2, Venus Express, Cluster.

SL-type fairing is used for commercial launches by Starsem. The fairing has external diameter of 3.7 m and a length of 8.45 m. The Fregat upper stage is encapsulated in the fairing with the payload and a payload adapter/dispenser. SL-type fairing along with Fregat upper stage were used to launch the following spacecraft: CoRoT.

ST-type fairing is used for commercial launches by Starsem. Its external diameter is 4.1 m and its length is 11.4 m. It can be used with the Soyuz-2 only, because older analog control system cannot cope with aerodynamic instability introduced by a fairing this large. This carbon-plastic fairing is based on the proven configuration used for Arianespace's Ariane 4 vehicles, with its length increased by approximately one additional meter. The fairing has been developed and is being manufactured by TsSKB-Progress in accordance with the requirements of a customer (Starsem). This is the only fairing type offered by Starsem/Arianespace for launches from Kourou. Progress M-UM is the only Progress Spacecraft that was launched while being enclosed in a ST fairing.

Stages

First stage 

The first stage of Soyuz rockets consists of four identical conical liquid booster rockets, strapped to the second stage core. Each booster has a single rocket motor with four combustion chambers, two vernier combustion chambers, and one set of turbopumps.

Statistics (each of 4 boosters)
 Gross mass: 44.5 tonne (98,100 lb)
 Propellant: 39.2 tonne (86,400 lb)
 Dry mass: 3784 kg (8,342 lb)
 Diameter: 2.68 m (8 ft 10 in)
 Length: 19.6 m (64 ft 4 in)
 Burn time: 118 seconds
 Engines:
 Soyuz and Soyuz-U models
 RD-107
 Thrust 813 kN (183 klbf) at liftoff
 Thrust 991 kN (223 klbf) in vacuum
 Specific impulse  at liftoff
 Specific impulse  in vacuum
 Chamber pressure 5.85 MPa (848 psi)
 Soyuz-ST models
 RD-107A (14D22)
 Thrust 838 kN (188 klbf) at liftoff
 Thrust 1021 kN (230 klbf) in vacuum
 Specific impulse  at liftoff (estimed)
 Specific impulse  in vacuum (estimed)
 Chamber pressure 5.85 MPa (848 psi)
 Soyuz-FG
 RD-107A (14D22)
 Thrust 775 kN (174 klbf) at liftoff
 Specific impulse  in vacuum

Second stage 

The second stage of the Soyuz booster is a single, generally cylindrical stage with one motor at the base and is activated with the first stage. Like each of the first-stage rockets, it also has four combustion chambers and one set of turbopumps, but four (instead of two) vernier combustion chambers. The second stage tapers toward the bottom to allow the four first-stage rockets to fit more closely together.

 Gross mass: 105.4 tonne (232,400 lb)
 Propellant: 95.4 tonne (210,000 lb)
 Propellant (Soyuz-U2 with Syntin propellant): 96.4 tonne (212,000 lb)
 Dry mass: 6875 kg (15,160 lb)
 Length: 28 m (91 ft 10 in)
 Diameter: 2.95 m (9 ft 8 in)
 Burn time: 290 seconds
 Engines:
 Soyuz and Soyuz-U models
 RD-108
 Thrust 779 kN (175 klbf) at liftoff
 Thrust 997 kN (224 klbf) in vacuum
 Specific impulse  at liftoff
 Specific impulse  in vacuum
 Chamber pressure 5.1 MPa (740 psi)
 Soyuz-U2 model with Syntin fuel
 RD-108
 Thrust 811 kN (182 klbf) at liftoff
 Thrust 1009 kN (227 klbf) in vacuum
 Specific impulse  at liftoff
 Specific impulse  in vacuum
 Chamber pressure 5.1 MPa (740 psi)
 Soyuz-ST models
 RD-118 (11D512)
 Thrust 792 kN (178 klbf) at liftoff
 Thrust 990 kN (222 klbf) in vacuum
 Specific impulse  at liftoff (est)
 Specific impulse  in vacuum (est)
 Chamber pressure 5.85 MPa (848 psi)

Third stage 

There are two variant upper stages in use, the Block I and Improved Block-I (used in Soyuz-2-1b).
 Gross mass: 25.2 tonne (55,600 lb)
 Propellant: 21.4-22.9 tonne (47,200 – 50,500 lb)
 Dry mass: 2355 kg (5190 lb)
 Length: 6.7 m (22 ft)
 Diameter: 2.66 m (8 ft 9 in)
 Burn time: 240 seconds
 Engine:
 Block I
 RD-0110
 Thrust 298 kN (67.0 klbf)
 Specific impulse 
 Chamber pressure 6.8 MPa (986 psi)
 Improved Block I
 RD-0124 (11D451)
 Thrust 294 kN (66 klbf)
 Specific impulse 
 Chamber pressure 16.2 MPa (2350 psi)

See also 

 Comparison of orbital launchers families
 List of R-7 launches, including launches of the Soyuz rocket family

References

Further reading 
 International Reference Guide to Space Launch Systems, Third Edition, Iaskowitz, Hopkins, and Hopkins ed., 1999, Reston, Virginia, AIAA Publications.

External links 
 Starsem
 Soyuz launch log at Starsem
 Soyuz-U/Fregat
 Soyuz launch vehicle: The most reliable means of space travel
 Soyuz Booster Family
 Soyuz User's Manual - Arianespace

.
Space launch vehicles of the Soviet Union
Soviet inventions
R-7 (rocket family)
1967 in spaceflight
1968 in spaceflight
1969 in spaceflight
1970 in spaceflight
1971 in spaceflight
1972 in spaceflight
1973 in spaceflight
Projects established in 1967
Russian inventions
Space launch vehicles of Russia
1960s in the Soviet Union
1970s in the Soviet Union